Jesse Noah Gruman (born August 29, 2005) is a Canadian actor best known for his roles in The Kid Detective, after he first gained recognition when playing the role of young Harold Jenkins in the Netflix original, The Umbrella Academy. Gruman marked his first theatrical appearance when appearing in the dramatic mystery, The Song of Names as Zygmunt Rapoport. He was nominated for the Outstanding Lead Performance category at the 2018 META awards for his lead role in the world premiere of The Hockey Sweater: A Musical, and won Best Leading Actor at the BroadwayWorld awards for the same production.

Early life 
Gruman was born and raised in Montreal, Quebec. His artistic passion began when he took up violin at the age of three and started studying dance at the age of five.

Career 
Gruman made his professional debut playing his lead role in the world premiere of The Hockey Sweater: A Musical at the Segal Centre for Performing Arts. Gruman played the main role of Roch in the original cast, working closely alongside Donna Feore, Roch Carrier and Emil Sher. Later that year, Gruman was nominated at the 2018 META awards for Outstanding Lead Actor for his performance in the musical, and won Best Leading Actor at the Broadway World awards.

In 2018, Gruman went on to film the Netflix original The Umbrella Academy, in which he played the role of Young Harold. Later that year, Gruman went on to film The Song of Names, playing the son of Dovidl Rapoport, played by Clive Owen, Zygmunt Rapoport. This film marked his first theatrical appearance.

In 2020, Gruman marked his second theatrical appearance in The Kid Detective. He played the lead-supporting role formally known as young Abe, the kid detective. Adam Brody plays the lead role: the older version of their shared character, Abe Applebaum.

Filmography

Film

Television

Video Games

Theatre

Awards and nominations

Theatre

References

External links 

2005 births
Canadian male television actors
Canadian male film actors
Male actors from Montreal
Living people
21st-century Canadian male actors